Tushar Khandker (born 5 April 1985) is an Indian former field hockey player. He represented India in Men's Hockey during the 2012 London Olympics.

Khandker comes from a family of hockey players as his father, uncle and elder brother played the game.

Career
Tushar Khandker made his debut in for India in 2003 when he was included in the Hockey Australia Challenge Cup in which he scored in his first game.
He was a part of the team that won the 2004 Junior Asia Cup and the 2007 Men's senior Asia Cup, thereby becoming the first Indian to be a part of the Asian Cups for all age groups. Tushar is an alumnus of Jamia Millia Islamia, New Delhi.

Hockey India League
During the auction of the inaugural season of the Hockey India League, Khandker was bought by the Uttar Pradesh franchise for US$14,000 with his base price being US$13,900. The Uttar Pradesh team was named Uttar Pradesh Wizards.

References

External links

1985 births
Living people
Field hockey players at the 2012 Summer Olympics
Olympic field hockey players of India
Asian Games medalists in field hockey
Field hockey players at the 2006 Asian Games
Field hockey players at the 2010 Asian Games
Field hockey players from Uttar Pradesh
Indian male field hockey players
Asian Games bronze medalists for India
Commonwealth Games silver medallists for India
Field hockey players at the 2010 Commonwealth Games
Commonwealth Games medallists in field hockey
Medalists at the 2010 Asian Games
Field hockey players at the 2006 Commonwealth Games
People from Jhansi
Jamia Millia Islamia alumni
2006 Men's Hockey World Cup players
2010 Men's Hockey World Cup players
Medallists at the 2010 Commonwealth Games